The Jacobs cabinet was the 9th cabinet of Sint Maarten. It was part of the executive branch of the Sint Maarten Government and was formed by members of the National Alliance and the United St. Maarten Party. It was followed by the second Jacobs cabinet installed after the 2020 snap general election.

The cabinet was formed following the collapse of the Second Marlin-Romeo cabinet in September 2019, when Franklin Meyers, faction leader of the United Democrats, left his party to become an independent member of parliament. On 22 September 2019, UD members of parliament, Luc Mercelina and Chanel Brownbill, followed suit.

It was installed by Governor Eugene Holiday on 19 November 2019.

Composition
The cabinet is composed as follows:

|Prime Minister
|Silveria Jacobs
|NA
|19 November 2019
|-
|Minister of Housing, Physical Planning, and Environment
|Christopher Wever
|
|19 November 2019
|-
|Minister of Finance
|Ardwell Irion
|NA
|19 November 2019
|-
|Minister of Justice
|Egbert Doran
|NA
|19 November 2019
|-
|Minister of Education, Culture, Youth, and Sports
|Ardwell Irion
|NA
|19 November 2019
|-
|rowspan="2"|Minister of Tourism, Economic Affairs, Transport and Telecommunications
|Rene Violenes (interim)
|NA
|19 November 2019
|-
|Mellissa Arrindell-Doncher
|USP
|28 November 2019
|-
|rowspan="2"|Minister of Healthcare, Social Development, and Labor
|Egbert Doran (interim)
|NA
|19 November 2019
|-
|Pamela Gordon-Lake
|USP
|28 November 2019
|-
|rowspan="2"|Minister Plenipotentiary of Sint Maarten
|Silveria Jacobs (interim)
|NA
|19 November 2019
|-
|Rene Violenes
|NA
|28 November 2019
|}

References

Jacobs
Jacobs
Jacobs